
The Lenin Boys were the paramilitary of the Hungarian Soviet Republic in 1919. The group consisted of around 200 men, it was a formed subdivision of the Soviet Army. The Lenin Boys were used as an instrument to suppress counter-revolutionary urges against the revolutionary government.

The armoured train of Terror

After a failed counter-revolutionary coup attempt in June 1919, communist leader Béla Kun is said to have used the Lenin Youth to stamp out counter-revolutionary urges among monarchists and other reactionaries. Tallies of the number of victims of the terror vary; different sources generally count the dead at around 400 to 600. A book published by Albert Váry in 1922, titled "The Victims of Red Terror in Hungary" documents 590 suspects executed by communist paramilitaries.

{{Quotation|
The Counter-revolutionaries are running and propagandizing against us everywhere, beat them! Beat them to death where you find them! If the counter-revolution succeeds even for an hour, they won't spare a single proletarian. Before they can drown our revolution in blood, you must drown them in their own blood!|Tibor Szamuely (People's Commissar), Vörös Újság (RED NEWS), 11 February 1919.}}

The crew of Tibor Szamuely's death train was made up partly of them, partly of groups from the Mozdony Street Teachers' College and the Trefort Street High School. Its composition varied, but there were 34 permanent members who were identified. These are, in alphabetical order: Babulka Engelbert, László Berényi, Mór Braun, István Dékány, Antal Gábor, József Gáspár, Géza Gerlei, Mihály Hefter, Béla Huber, Gyula Jónás, Árpád Kerekes (Maxim Jablonszki, József Kámán, Gyula Knechtl) Lajos, János Köves, József Krajcsovics, Antal Leviritz, Béla London, Mór Lőbl, Béla Lőwinger, László Lukács, József Major, József Mann, Miksa Max, József Oswald, István Pálinkás, Géza Pap, Gábor Stön, László Szamuely, Vladimir Urasov. In the cases where Szamuely launched mass reprisals (e.g. István Bartalos, Tibor Bonyháti, Gábor Csomor, Péter Csoba, Imre Dögei, Géza Groó, Lipót Holtzmann, József Kakas, József Kuszkó, Márton Löscher, Ferenc Miákovics, Károly Pergovátz, Mihály Pervanger, Mihály Pintér ? , Simits ?, Aladár Steier, János Steiger, Vilmos Verszk. Prosecutors found that the Lenin boys on the "special train" were accomplices in 92 proven murders.

On 19 May 1919, the Cserny group was disarmed in Gödöllő. To this end, the army high command mobilised two battalions and an artillery unit. Their weapons were as follows: seven 140 millimetre mortars, six 90 millimetre mortars, three 75 millimetre anti-tank guns, seven infantry guns, seven machine guns, 64 crates of bombs, 130 crates of hand grenades, 41 crates of machine gun ammunition, 115 crates of ammunition for infantry guns, 807 crates of ammunition for mortars. They also had eight cars and six trucks.

The majority of the group was sent to the front. 25 men continued to guard the Soviet House, and 43 men were assigned to the Political Investigation Department under the command of Ottó Korvin and Cserny. This became the "second Cserny group".

They often collaborated with the Lenin boys, led by Szamuely, the people of the Frontal Opposition Committee. The infamous armoured train of Szamuely was often manned by terrorists belonging to the Cherny group, who thus took part in the suppression of all major real or imagined counter-revolutionary uprisings. 

At the beginning of June, Ottó Korvin informed the Cabinet that he could no longer cooperate with the V. subdivision headed by Cserny. However, the counter-revolutionary uprising that broke out on 24 June changed the situation. Cserny's group played an important role in putting down the anti-Communist rebellion.

After the Hungarian–Romanian War, Romanian Army troops entered Hungary and took Budapest on August 6, 1919, Kun and other members of the government fled. After the arrival of Miklós Horthy's counter-revolutionary death squads in Budapest three months later, anti-communist officers carried out waves of retributive violence against communists and their supporters (as well as suspected leftists of any stripe) known as the White Terror, wherein as many as 1,000 people were killed. As most communist leaders were ethnically Jewish, this encouraged anti-semitic lynchings in Budapest by paramilitary forces. 

The army of the Soviet Republic was defeated on 1 August 1919. After the surrender, the Communist leadership was allowed to flee, leaving Otto Korvin and Lenin's boys in Hungary. Their trial began on 25 November 1919.

Cserny was captured, tried, and executed by the new regime in December 1919, along with several other Lenin Boys.

Execution

On 18 December 1919, the following 14 people were executed in the prison at 85 Margit Boulevard:
József Cserny, Sándor Papp, Ferenc Kakas, Sándor Mészáros, Gábor Schön, Max Miksa, Tibor Bonyháti, Géza Groó, Mór Löbl, Gábor Steomor, János Steiger, Márton Löscher, Lajos Küvér, Géza Neumayer. 

The Hungarian Curia (Supreme Court) rejected one by one of the fourteen terrorist pardon requests and allowed free access to justice. At the behest of the state prosecutor's office, the death sentences were carried out in the courtyard of the Margit Boulevard military prison on Thursday morning from 8 a.m. to noon. Three criminal judges appeared at the execution: drdr. Gyula Keresztessy, dr. Károly Gebhard and dr. Béla Nagy, also dr. Ferenc Szücs clerk. The Public Prosecutor's Office was appointed by dr. He was represented by Elemér Felföldy, Public Prosecutor. On the afternoon of December 17, Dr. Elemér Felföldy, the public prosecutor, announced the rejection decision of the court's pardon committee, and then placed all fourteen people on death in the prison, which had been converted into an execution house.

The death row inmates were visited by their relatives in the afternoon. They all brought plenty of food, drink, cigars and cigarettes. The prosecutor's office ruled that those sentenced to death could consume everything, but received only minimal alcohol.

See also
Red Terror (Hungary)

 Sources 
 Borsanyi, Gyorgy. The Life of a Communist Revolutionary, Béla Kun, translated by Mario Fenyo, Boulder, Colorado: Social Science Monographs; New York: Distributed by Columbia University Press, 1993.

 References 

External links

Cécile Tormay: An outlaw's diary'' (1923)

Communism in Hungary
Law enforcement in communist states
Aftermath of World War I in Hungary
1919 in Hungary